Tomingaj is a village in Croatia. Nikola Tesla at one point lived in Tomingaj.

Population

According to the 2011 census, Tomingaj had 26 inhabitants.

1991 census

According to the 1991 census, settlement of Tomingaj had 292 inhabitants, which were ethnically declared as this:

Austro-hungarian 1910 census

According to the 1910 census, settlement of Tomingaj had 1,256 inhabitants in 8 hamlets, which were linguistically and religiously declared as this:

Literature 

  Savezni zavod za statistiku i evidenciju FNRJ i SFRJ, popis stanovništva 1948, 1953, 1961, 1971, 1981. i 1991. godine.
 Knjiga: "Narodnosni i vjerski sastav stanovništva Hrvatske, 1880–1991: po naseljima, author: Jakov Gelo, izdavač: Državni zavod za statistiku Republike Hrvatske, 1998., ;

References

External links

Populated places in Zadar County
Lika
Serb communities in Croatia